Matthew Worland Wood (March 2, 1879 – May 10, 1969) was a farmer and political figure on Prince Edward Island. He represented 3rd Queens in the Legislative Assembly of Prince Edward Island from 1932 to 1935 as a Conservative.

He was born in Mount Herbert, Prince Edward Island, the son of Robert Wood. Wood was a cattle dealer and was also one of the earliest fox ranchers on the island. He was married twice: to Ethel Catherine Wood in 1902 and then later to Maude MacPherson after his first wife's death. Wood served in the province's Executive Council as a minister without portfolio. He ran unsuccessfully for reelection to the provincial assembly in 1935, 1939, 1943, 1947 and 1951. Wood died at a nursing home in Charlottetown at the age of 90.
He had two daughters and one son who died as an infant.

References 
 

Progressive Conservative Party of Prince Edward Island MLAs
1879 births
1969 deaths